The News Media Association is a trade body which styles itself as "the voice of national, regional and local news media organisations in the UK". It was created in 2014 by a merger between the Newspaper Society and the Newspaper Publishers' Association. The Newspaper Society, which represented local papers in the United Kingdom, was founded in 1836 and the Newspaper Publishers' Association, which represented national publishers, in 1904.  The two organisations had been sharing offices since 2006.

The NMA promotes the interests of news media publishers to government, regulatory authorities, industry bodies and other organisations whose work affects the industry. Members include The Sun, The Guardian, Daily Mail, Daily Mirror, Yorkshire Post, Kent Messenger, Monmouthshire Beacon and the Manchester Evening News. The organisation represents digital as well as print based media.  It supports the Independent Publishers' Forum.

David Newell, former NMA CEO, was appointed an OBE in the Queen's Birthday Honours in June 2017 for services to the newspaper and publishing industries.

In April 2020, the NME announced it would be partnering with the Government on "a three-month advertising partnership to help keep the public safe and the nation united throughout the Covid-19 pandemic".

References

News media in the United Kingdom
Trade associations based in the United Kingdom
Newspaper associations